Bharatiya Janata Party, or simply, BJP is the affiliate of Bharatiya Janata Party for the state of Uttar Pradesh. Its head office is situated at the BJP Bhavan, 7, Vidhan Sabha Marg, Lucknow.

Electoral History

Legislative Assembly election

Lok Sabha election

Leadership

Chief Minister

Deputy Chief Minister

Leaders of the Opposition

President

See also
 Bharatiya Janata Party, Gujarat
 Bharatiya Janata Party, Assam
 Bharatiya Janata Party, Madhya Pradesh
 Organisation of the Bharatiya Janata Party
 Apna Dal (Sonelal)
 NISHAD Party

References 

Political parties in Uttar Pradesh
Uttar Pradesh